Edmund Sexton Pery, 1st Viscount Pery (8 April 1719 – 24 February 1806; middle name also spelt Sexten) was an Anglo-Irish politician who served as Speaker of the Irish House of Commons between 1771 and 1785.

Early life
He was born in Limerick, into one of the city's most politically influential families, elder son of the Rev. Stackpole Pery and Jane Twigge. His maternal grandfather was William Twigg, Archdeacon of Limerick.

Political career
A trained barrister, Pery became a member of the Irish House of Commons for the Wicklow Borough constituency in 1751. On the dissolution of the house following the death of George II, Pery was elected for the constituency of Limerick City and served from 1761 until 1785, becoming Speaker of the House in 1771. In 1783, he stood also for Dungannon, however chose to sit for Limerick City. He was considered one of the most powerful politicians in Ireland in his time, leading a faction which included his nephew the future Earl of Limerick and his relatives by marriage, the Hartstonges. Following his resignation, he was created Viscount Pery, of Newtown Pery, near the City of Limerick, in the Peerage of Ireland, entitling him to a seat in the Irish House of Lords. As he had no male heirs, his title became extinct on his death.

Role in the development of Limerick 
Pery is also noted for his part in the history of the architecture of Limerick. In 1765, he commissioned the engineer Davis Ducart to design a town plan for land that Pery owned on the southern edge of the existing city, which led to the construction of the Georgian area of the city later known as Newtown Pery. He was also commemorated in the naming of Pery Square.

Family 
Pery married Patricia Patty) Martin of Dublin in 1756, who died a year later, and secondly Elizabeth Vesey, daughter of John Vesey, 1st Baron Knapton and Elizabeth Brownlow. He and Elizabeth had two daughters:
Hon. Diana Pery, who married her cousin Thomas Knox, 1st Earl of Ranfurly.
Hon. Frances Pery, who married Nicolson Calvert, MP for Hertfordshire. 
Pery's younger brother, William, was a leading figure in the Church of Ireland, becoming Bishop of Killala and subsequently Bishop of Limerick; he was also ennobled as Baron Glentworth. William's son, Edmund, was made Earl of Limerick in 1803 as a result of his support for the Act of Union. Pery's younger sister was Lucy Hartstonge,  the founder of what is now St John's Hospital.

See also
 History of Limerick

References

1719 births
1806 deaths
Irish MPs 1727–1760
Irish MPs 1761–1768
Irish MPs 1769–1776
Irish MPs 1776–1783
Irish MPs 1783–1790
Speakers of the Parliament of Ireland (pre-1801)
Peers of Ireland created by George III
Viscounts in the Peerage of Ireland
Members of the Privy Council of Ireland
Members of the Irish House of Lords
Members of the Parliament of Ireland (pre-1801) for County Wicklow constituencies
Members of the Parliament of Ireland (pre-1801) for County Limerick constituencies
Members of the Parliament of Ireland (pre-1801) for County Tyrone constituencies
Edmund